USS Callaghan (DD/DDG-994) was the second ship of the Kidd class of destroyers operated by the U.S. Navy. Derived from the Spruance class, these vessels were designed for air defense in hot weather. She was named for Rear Admiral Daniel J. Callaghan, who was killed in action aboard his flagship, the heavy cruiser San Francisco, during the Naval Battle of Guadalcanal on 13 November 1942.

Originally to be named Daryush, the ship was ordered by the Shah of Iran, but was undelivered when the 1979 Iranian Revolution occurred. Subsequent to this, the U.S. Navy elected to commission her and her sister ships for service in the Persian Gulf and Mediterranean Sea, as they were equipped with heavy-duty air conditioning and were also well suited to filtering sand and the NBC warfare contaminants.

History

1981–1998: U.S. service
She was commissioned in 1981, and home ported in San Diego County, California at NAS North Island.

On 1 September 1983 Callaghan was on deployment to the Western Pacific, and making a port visit in Sasebo, Japan. Korean Air Lines Flight 007, on its way from Anchorage, Alaska to Seoul, South Korea, carrying 269 passengers and crew, strayed into Soviet airspace.  A Soviet Sukhoi Su-15 fighter jet was sent up to destroy the intruding Boeing 747. After the attack, the Callaghans crew was recalled and sent to search for survivors. During its survey of the crash site, the Callaghan was under very close scrutiny of the Soviet Navy, narrowly avoiding open conflict while engaged in their search. No survivors were found. The Callaghan received a Meritorious Unit Citation from the U.S. Navy and a special citation from the South Korean government for its role in the mission.

Callaghan earned her first Battle Efficiency E for grade period July 1983 to December 1984, and earned the Humanitarian Service Medal for saving two boatloads of people in the South China Sea.

For grading period January 1985 to June 1986 Callaghan earned her second Battle Efficiency E by winning all the awards from the ships in competition. On her return to port, with the news of her clean sweep, the Captain ordered that every lanyard on the ship would display a broom, to honor the crew and show all ships present the outstanding accomplishment. Clean sweeps are rare.

In 1992 the Callaghan did a world cruise. She left San Diego 21 Jan with two other destroyers sailing to the Persian Gulf. The first stop of the cruise was Honolulu 27–28 Jan 1992. Where there was a change of command ceremony. The ships then sailed to Subic Bay, Philippines arriving 10 Feb for a short working port stop. The next stop was Singapore 18 Feb. Then stopping for fuel in Columbo, Sri Lanka on 24th. On 1 March the ships arrived in the gulf and went onto separate missions. The Callaghan took up "shotgun" for the USS America CV-66.  Stopping in Jubail, Saudi Arabia. Baharain. Abu Dahbi, United Arab Emerites (U.A.E.). Jebel U.A.E.. Dubai, U.A.E.. Damman, Saudi Arabia. Kuwait City, Kuwait. In May 1992 the Callaghan began its independent cruise. Transitting the Suez canal 12 May. The Callaghan steamed up the coast of Italy and anchored at Menton, France 16 May. Then made a port call in Barcelona, Spain 21 May. Callaghan began to sail across the Atlantic Ocean, stopping at the Azore Islands for fuel. Arriving at St. Thomas, US Virgin Islands 5 July. On 12 July the Callaghan transited the Panama Canal. Then made their last port call of Acapulco, Mexico 16 July. Finally returning to San Diego late July. The ship's crew earned the Royal order of Magellan certificate for sailing around the world. Both ditch certificates (Panama and Suez) and the crossing the international date line certificate.

Also of note, on 27 September 1997, during routine drug interdiction operations, Callaghan detected a high speed contact off Colombia waters. When the sun rose the contact was visually identified as a high speed cigarette boat. Callaghan pursued the contact for over three days, and in the final three hours the craft dumped its load of illegal drugs. Once completed the craft was able to accelerate and outran Callaghan. It was pursued by a high speed craft and helicopters until the cigarette boat reached Colombia territorial waters. Callaghan returned and fished 3.5 metric tons of watertight cocaine bundles floating in the water. The bales tested to be pure cocaine and had a street value at over $1 billion.  They were individually unloaded by the crew dressed in whites during the first CONUS port call upon return from the deployment in a spectacular media event covered by all networks in NAVSTA San Diego.

Callaghan was decommissioned in April 1998.

2004–present: Taiwanese service
Callaghan was sold to Taiwan in 2004. She was originally to be named Ming Teh, but it was later decided to name her ROCS Su Ao (DDG-1802), after the Su-Ao naval base in eastern Taiwan, and become the second ship of the new ROCN Kee Lung class of destroyers.

After almost two years of refit and training in the U.S., Su Ao was commissioned on 17 December 2005 at Kee-Lung naval port in northern Taiwan.

Popular culture
 In the movie Threads, the ship collided with the Russian battlecruiser  during a naval battle in the Persian Gulf.

References

External links

 Navysite.de: USS Callaghan

 

1979 ships
Cold War destroyers of the United States
Kidd-class destroyers
Ships built in Pascagoula, Mississippi